Emarginula hawaiiensis is a species of sea snail, a marine gastropod mollusk in the family Fissurellidae, the keyhole limpets and slit limpets.

References

External links
 To Biodiversity Heritage Library (2 publications)
 To USNM Invertebrate Zoology Mollusca Collection
 To World Register of Marine Species

Fissurellidae
Gastropods described in 1895